There are, 165 members of the International Organization for Standardization. Three types of membership status can be distinguished:
full member (member body)
correspondent member
subscriber member

Members

Map

See also
International Organization for Standardization
ISO country code
List of technical standard organizations

References

External links 
www.oasis-open.org
ISO website

Countries
International Organization for Standardization